Dance Music is the soundtrack album by Welsh multi-instrumentalist John Cale composed for a ballet about Nico performed by the dancers of Scapino Ballet Rotterdam. The music was played by Ice Nine. The choreography of Scapino Ballet was conceived and directed by Ed Wubbe. The premiere took place in Rotterdam on 4 October 1997. Most of the songs were performed by a nine-piece ensemble Ice Nine, (except "Ari Sleepy Too" and "Nibelungen" by Nico and "España" by Cale on piano). "Nibelungen" is a track that Cale arranged for Nico's The Marble Index album.

It was then released on CD in 1998 on Detour Records label.

In a retrospective review, AllMusic wrote that the result although no showing any obvious connection to Nico, "displays a variety of colors and moods, ranging from pop to more classical styles, and often reveals a spare beauty".

Track listing
All tracks composed by John Cale, except "Ari Sleepy Too" and "Nibelungen" by Nico.
"Intro" − 4:13
"New York Underground" − 3:52
"Night Club Theme" − 2:08
"Modelling" − 10:22
"Out of China" − 5:04
"Death Camp" − 3:39
"Ari Sleepy Too" − 4:44
"Iceberg I" − 7:39
"Jim" − 5:09
"Iceberg II" − 8:01
"España" − 9:48
"Nibelungen" − 2:44

Personnel
 John Cale − piano
 Tineke de Jong − violin
 Jan Schoonenberg − viola
 Ernst Grapperhause − viola
 Baptist Kervers − viola
 Marjolein Meijer − cello
 Jasper Teule − double bass
 Corrie van Binsbergen − guitar
 Marc van de Geer − piano, synthesizer
 Arend Niks − percussion
 Dave Soldier − string arrangements

References

John Cale albums
1998 soundtrack albums
Albums produced by John Cale